The United Holy Church of America, Inc. is the oldest African-American Holiness-Pentecostal body in the world. It was established in 1886. It is a predominantly black Holiness Pentecostal Christian denomination, and the International Headquarters is located in Greensboro, North Carolina. The UHCA consists of 516 churches, 17 districts, and 8 territories. The largest and the oldest district of the connectional body is the Southern District Convocation (Goldsboro, NC).

History 
This church was organized as the outgrowth of what was called a "holiness revival", sparked by the meetings held by Isaac Cheshier at Method, North Carolina a suburb of Raleigh, North Carolina), in 1886. It began as a regional body. On October 13, 1894, in the city of Durham, North Carolina, the first convocation was organized. Those present were G.A. Mials, H.C. Snipes and S.S. Freeman, all of Raleigh, North Carolina; present also was G.W. Roberts of Durham, North Carolina, and L.M. Mason of Method, North Carolina. On October 15, 1900, a convention was called by the Rev. C.C. Craig to meet at Durham, North Carolina, to prepare a discipline for the government of the churches. Those present were H.C. Pettiford, H.C. Snipes, L.M. Mason, G.W. Roberts, Mrs. Emma E. Craig, and Mrs. L.J. Roberts. In the early 1900s, the church added a Pentecostal understanding. In 1900 this body called itself Holy Church of North Carolina, and later, as it grew, the Holy Church of North Carolina and Virginia. In 1916 the name United Holy Church of America was adopted, and the church was incorporated on September 15, 1918.

Districts 
Africa-Ghana District
Barbados District
Bermuda District
Central Western District*
Central Pacific District
Kentucky District
New England District
Northern District
Northwestern District
South Carolina District
Southeastern District
Southern District Goldsboro
Southern District Henderson
Virginia District
Western District
Western North Carolina District
Central Western District
West Virginia District
St. Lucia-West Indies District

The Southern District of the United Holy Church of America came into being in the year 1894 in the city of Durham, North Carolina. This was the first and the largest of all the districts in the connection. It was organized by Elders C.C. Craig, L.M. Mason, George W. Roberts, H.C. Snipes, and H.C. Pettiford, along with Mother E.E. Craig, and Mrs. L.J. Roberts. Elder L.M. Mason was chosen as its first president. The Virginia District was organized by Bishop W.N. Strobhar. Bishop Thomas E. Talley was appointed the first president, and Bishop S. G. McCoy served as vice president. The first convocation was held in August 1969 in Portsmouth, Virginia, and Mrs. Elsie Harris served as its first secretary. The Southeastern District, originally known as the Florida-Georgia District, was organized in 1948 by Bishop G.J. Branch. On December 10, 1969, at Fisher Memorial United Holy Church in Durham, North Carolina, the Western North Carolina District was organized by Bishop W.N. Strobhar and other General officers. Bishop A.W. Lawson was appointed the first president, and Bishop N.M. Midgett was chosen to serve as vice president.

In June 1920, in Philadelphia, Pennsylvania, bishops H.L. Fisher and G.J. Branch and other general officers met at a call-meeting of the independent group of Holy Churches in this city and nearby towns, and organized the churches into a district known as the Northern District Convocation of the United Holy Church of America, Inc. Bishop G.J. Branch of Goldsboro, North Carolina was chosen as the president of the district embracing the states of New York, New Jersey, Pennsylvania, Delaware, Maryland and the District of Columbia. Following this, in 1924, in the city of Columbus, Ohio, at the Gospel Tabernacle Church, whose pastor was Elder John E. Harris, the Northwestern District was organized into a District Convocation by Bishop G.J. Branch, Bishop H.L. Fisher, and Bishop J.D. Diggs, along with other General officers of the Church. Bishop J.D. Diggs of Winston-Salem, North Carolina was chosen as its first president. Other officers were Bishop H.H. Hairston and Bishop S.G. McCoy. The states comprising this district were Ohio, Indiana, Michigan, West Virginia, Western Pennsylvania, Kentucky and Eastern Illinois. The West Virginia District was organized in 1935 through the work of Bishop J.D. Diggs after being separated  from the Northwestern District the previous year. The New England District, embracing the states of the New England area, was organized in August 1925. Bishop J.W. Houston was chosen as the first president of this district. The Central Western District was organized in 1930. The organizers were Bishop J.W. Houston, Elder Otis E. Evans, Mother Addie Houston, and Mother Susie Evans.

The United Holy Church district on the Pacific Coast was originally known, in 1924, as the Union of California United Holy Churches. In 1936 this district was named the Pacific Coast District, and later the Western District. The first headquarters for the district was in Los Angeles, and later in San Francisco. Bishop Henry Lee Fisher was the chief organizer of this district. The Central Pacific District was founded in March 2005 with Bishop Rafael Fortier, Jr., as its first president. The district began with its headquarters in San Francisco, California.

Internationally, the Bermuda District, covering the entire island of Bermuda, was organized in 1921 by Bishop Henry Lee Fisher. Associated with him in this effort were Elders Thomas Trott, C. H. Caisey and Patrick Mills, and Miss Majorie Trott. In the early history of the Barbados District, Evangelist Rosa B. Hawkins of San Francisco, California, organized five churches on the island of Barbados; however, these churches later joined with another Pentecostal body. The churches in Barbados that are presently a part of The United Holy Church of America were organized by the late Bishop Harry Townsend Gentles. He founded Mt. Olive United Holy Church in 1949, and it later became the headquarters church for the District. Bishop Gentles brought together some independent churches and organized new ones as well. These churches grew into the present-day Barbados District.

United Holy Church of America Governance
General President, General Vice-president, and General 2nd vice-president,
Bishops' Council, General Board of Bishops, Board of Elders (district and general church levels), District Board of Presbytery, District Presidents, District Elders, District & General Departments of Evangelism & Extension, Missions, Ushers, Music, YPHA (Young Peoples' Holy Association), BCS (Bible Church School), Publications, and the Holiness Union . The United Holy Church is broken down into districts, sub-districts and then local churches.

Divisions and Reunion

From January 1927 to March 1975, the Church experienced a breach in its Certificate of Incorporation. Through a Certificate of Rescission and a resolution passed at a General meeting, the Certificate of Incorporation was amended to allow the Church to exist as a perpetual institution. The Church's corporate status as a non-profit religious organization now exists in perpetuity. The Tenth Article of the 1918 Certificate of Incorporation was amended to reflect this change. In 1977, the Church divided when the Southern District Convocation, located in Goldsboro, North Carolina withdrew from fellowship with the parent body. However, in May 2000 in the city of Greensboro, North Carolina, the Southern District Convocation was reunited with the connectional body at the Quadrennial Session.

Mount Calvary Holy Church of America split from the United Holy Church in 1929 to form their own holiness Pentecostal body. Mount Sinai Holy Church of America separated from the mother church in 1924 to form an organization to create gender equality in episcopal ordination.

Former general presidents and presiding prelates
 Rt. Rev. L.M. Mason 1894-1901
 Rt. Rev. W.H. Fulford 1901-1916
 Rt. Rev. Henry L. Fisher 1916-1947
 Rt. Rev. G.J. Branch 1947-1949
 Rt. Rev. Henry H. Hairiston 1949-1963
 Rt. Rev. Walter N. Strobahr 1963-1980
 Rt. Rev. Joseph T. Bowens 1980-1992
 Rt. Rev. Thomas E. Talley 1992-1996
 Rt. Rev. Odell McCollum 1996-2005
 Rt. Rev. Elijah Williams 2005–2016
 Rt. Rev. Harry L Cohen 2016–Present

References
Handbook of Denominations in the United States, by Frank S. Mead, Samuel S. Hill, and Craig D. Atwood
The History of the United Holy Church of America, Inc., by Chester W. Gregory, Sr.

External links
The Official Web Site of the United Holy Church Of America
The Southern District Convocation
The Northern District Convocation
The Virginia District Convocation
The Bermuda District Convocation
The Central Western District Convocation
The Western District Convocation 
True Glory Ministries UHC
Littles Memorial Temple UHC
Gospel Tabernacle UHC
Jerusalem UHC, Reidsville, NC
New Stoney Hill UHC, Goldsboro, NC

Pentecostal denominations
Historically African-American Christian denominations
Holiness Pentecostals